As Above, So Below is the fourth studio album by British heavy metal band Angel Witch. It is their first studio album in 26 years, produced by Ghost producer Jaime Gomez Arellano.

Track listing
All songs written by Kevin Heybourne.

Personnel
Kevin Heybourne - guitars, vocals
Will Palmer - bass
Andy Prestridge - drums

References

2012 albums
Angel Witch albums
Metal Blade Records albums